Jang Il-ok (born ) is a female North Korean football defender. She was part of the North Korea women's national football team at the 2008 Summer Olympics.

See also
 North Korea at the 2008 Summer Olympics

References

External links

1986 births
Living people
North Korean women's footballers
Place of birth missing (living people)
Footballers at the 2008 Summer Olympics
Olympic footballers of North Korea
Women's association football defenders
North Korea women's international footballers